Howard H. Stevenson (June 27, 1941) is the Sarofim-Rock Baker Foundation Professor Emeritus at Harvard University. Forbes magazine described him as Harvard Business School's "lion of entrepreneurship" in a 2011 article. Howard is credited with defining entrepreneurship as "the pursuit of opportunity beyond the resources you currently control." INC Magazine described Howard's definition of entrepreneurship as "the best answer ever."

Stevenson is the author of eight books and 41 articles. His past roles at Harvard include chairman of Harvard Business Publishing, vice provost for resources and planning, and senior associate dean at HBS. He is often credited as being the most successful fundraiser in the history of Harvard University, raising over $600 million in philanthropic support for initiatives in business, science, healthcare, and student life. 

Stevenson is the co-founder and founding president of Baupost, a leading money management firm currently led by Seth Klarman. When he retired from active teaching at HBS, the University named an academic chair in his honor. 

He graduated from Stanford University and Harvard Business School.

Howard's Gift
Stevenson is the subject of a book written by his friend and former student, Eric Sinoway, an American author, entrepreneur, and executive, titled Howard's Gift: Uncommon Wisdom to Inspire Your Life's Work, which was released by St. Martin's Press on October 2, 2012.

The English edition of Howard's Gift was released in hardcopy, paperback, and audio. The book has been translated into Korean, Chinese, Traditional Chinese, and Japanese.

References

External links
Howard H. Stevenson papers at Baker Library Special Collections, Harvard Business School

Living people
American business theorists
Harvard Business School faculty
Harvard Business School alumni
Stanford University alumni
Year of birth missing (living people)